Calist Andrew Mwatela (born 1947) is a Kenyan politician and educator. He was a member of the East African Legislative Assembly, representing Kenya from 2001 to 2006. He represented Mwatate Constituency in the National Assembly of Kenya on an Orange Democratic Movement ticket. He was elected in 2007, but was unable to defend his seat in the 2013 general election.

He was born in Tungulu village in Bura, which is part of Taita-Taveta County. He worked as a primary school teacher, and during this time, he authored several school textbooks. He joined active politics, vying for the Mwatate seat with the Democratic Party of Kenya, then led by former Kenyan president Mwai Kibaki. He is married to Jacinta Mwatela, who served as deputy governor at the Central Bank of Kenya from 2005 to 2008.

He served as the assistant minister for Education during his term as member of parliament.

References

1947 births
Living people
People from Taita-Taveta County
Democratic Party (Kenya) politicians
Orange Democratic Movement politicians
Members of the National Assembly (Kenya)
Members of the East African Legislative Assembly